Derick Chuka Ogbu (born 19 March 1990) nicknamed Chuka, is a Nigerian professional footballer with a Belgium passport who plays as a forward. He has played most notably in the Belgian Pro League Romanian Liga I Chinese Super League and Japanese Top League.

Club career

Gulf
Ogbu started his career in Al-Salam where he played for one season and became the joint top scorer in the Oman Professional League, scoring 12 goals in 2008/2009 season. 

In February 2010, he took an important step in his career making a free transfer to Umm Salal in the Qatar Stars League. At that time Umm Salal was just celebrating their massive achievement, being the first Qatar club to reach Asian Champions league Quarter finals. Henk ten Cate gave young Ogbu his debut, both in the league games and in the cup. Ogbu scored an important goals on his debut in the cup, which lead his team to Quarter and Semi final and Final.
As a young striker, he led the front line in his first massive game in the Qatar Crown prince Cup Final, where he played 90minutes in front of a massive crowd of 55,000 fans in attendance in Khalifa International Stadium, of which both the late Ruler of Qatar( Hamad Bin Khalifa At Thani and formal president of Brazil Lulu de Silva was in attendance. 

After a season and a half, with 5 goals in his senior games, and 10 goals in reserve games, he left for trial at PSV Eindhoven during the 2011/2012 pre-season on the recommendation of then Umm Salal manager Henk ten Cate. 
However, his trials with Eindhoven was successful, as he scored in all the 3 test games, but unfortunately, he did not sign for them because of the financial situation of Eindhoven and also more complication as he comes from outside EU, but Fred Rutten, the coach of PSV, described him as "very fast and interesting player, with good character and a hard shot".
Due to the strong connection between PSV Eindhoven and the Belgium club (OHL Leuven), the player was sent to OHL to play so PSV could keep their eyes on him, as they expect their financial situation to improve.
On 10 August 2011, he signed for the Belgium club Oud-Heverlee Leuven Ogbu became the love of the fans in Leuven, the fans love him and he love the club. The instantly became the club hitman and their valuable asset. Ogbu was once quoted, i love when the fans sings with my name, it gives me extra adrenaline to fight for the fans. After two amazing seasons in Leuven scoring 18goals, of which 7 of those 18 goals are almighty important goals for the club history. After two years in the top flight in Jupiler league Belgium, Ogbu decided its time to move on to another challenges. Ogbu made a transfer of 500,000 euros to Romanian Giant CFR Cluj. Due to the financial instability at the club, players were not paid for months, Ogbu managed to score 6goals in Romania, before a massive offer came from liaoning Whom Fc China. An offer of 1.2million dollar was made for the player, both the club and the player accepted the offer. Ogbu played his first and only Europa league game for the Romanian Giant before moving to China on 23 July 2014. It didn't take his time to adjust to Chinese football as Ogbu score twice on his debut in China first league against Shenzhen. He went on to write his name in Chinese Super League history, scoring 16 goals in Liaoning FC before moving to Japan Ventforest Kofu. He played less than a season with the Japan top league, making 11 appearances with only one goal. Things didn't go well for the player in Japan, he decided to move back to Europe, landing a deal with DVSC Debrecen. Injuries and potential transfer sage with the club didn't allow the player to settle in Debrecen. 
In 2019, The player signed with Al Ittihad club in Egypt, but unfortunately, the player was not happy with the situations of things in Egypt, so he decided to break his contract, so he can move back to Europe.

In January 2020, he signed a pre contract with a Chinese league one club, he took his Chinese visa, received his flight ticket, sadly 3 days to the departure date, COVID-19 started.

Chuka transferred to Chinese Super League side Liaoning Whowin on 25 July 2014.

References

External links
 

1990 births
Living people
Nigerian footballers
Nigerian expatriate footballers
Association football forwards
Qatar Stars League players
Umm Salal SC players
Belgian Pro League players
Oud-Heverlee Leuven players
Liga I players
Liga II players
CFR Cluj players
J1 League players
Liaoning F.C. players
Ventforet Kofu players
Debreceni VSC players
FC Spartaki Tskhinvali players
Al Ittihad Alexandria Club players
FC Universitatea Cluj players
Nemzeti Bajnokság I players
Egyptian Premier League players
Expatriate footballers in Qatar
Nigerian expatriate sportspeople in Qatar
Expatriate footballers in Belgium
Nigerian expatriate sportspeople in Belgium
Expatriate footballers in Georgia (country)
Expatriate footballers in Romania
Nigerian expatriate sportspeople in Romania
Expatriate footballers in China
Expatriate footballers in Hungary
Nigerian expatriate sportspeople in Hungary
Expatriate footballers in Egypt
Nigerian expatriate sportspeople in Egypt
Chinese Super League players
Sportspeople from Port Harcourt